I Never Knew You is the second extended play by American rapper Cage. Released by Adult Swim and Definitive Jux, the EP was released to promote Cage's album Depart from Me and the first music video from that album, "I Never Knew You", and contained four exclusive tracks. The title track, "I Never Knew You", appeared on the album Depart from Me.

I Never Knew You was initially released as a free digital download, but has since been released through digital stores.

Release 
The EP was released in conjunction with the release of a music video for "I Never Knew You"  directed by Shia LaBeouf. The video features actor Dan Byrd following a woman played by Scarlett Kapella. The video was shot on location in downtown Los Angeles on February 21 and 22, and featured cameos from LaBeouf, Alex Pardee, and Definitive Jux artists such as El-P, Aesop Rock, Chauncey, F. Sean Martin and Yak Ballz.

Track listing

References 

2009 EPs
Cage (rapper) EPs